Ribosomal RNA-processing protein 8 is a protein that in humans is encoded by the RRP8 gene.

References

Further reading

External links 
 PDBe-KB provides an overview of all the structure information available in the PDB for Human Ribosomal RNA-processing protein 8 (KIAA0409)